Sudół  is a village in the administrative district of Gmina Bodzechów, within Ostrowiec County, Świętokrzyskie Voivodeship, in south-central Poland.

The village has a population of 670.

The Krzemionki Prehistoric Striped Flint Mining Region, a UNESCO World Heritage Site and Historic Monument of Poland is located in Sudół.

During the January Uprising, on May 4, 1863, the village was the site of a battle, in which Polish insurgents led by Dionizy Czachowski defeated the Russians.

References

Villages in Ostrowiec County